A spin kit is a kit for a sailplane to make it spin. The kit consists of ballast weights (usually discs) applied to the tail to move the center of gravity rearward. This increases the instability of the glider, enabling it to spin.

A few sailplanes are very difficult, if not impossible, to spin under normal conditions. To make these sailplanes spin easily, for training purposes or demonstrations, a spin kit is available from the manufacturer.

References
 Schleicher ASK 21 Flight Manual

External links
 Video clip of the spin training exercise at YouTube

Aerodynamics
Gliding